Rohoznice is name of several locations in the Czech Republic:

 Rohoznice, a village in Pardubice Region (Pardubice District)
 Rohoznice, a village in Hradec Králové Region (Jičín District)